Lynn Bari (born Marjorie Schuyler Fisher, December 18, 1919 – November 20, 1989) was a film actress who specialized in playing sultry, statuesque man-killers in roughly 150 films for 20th Century Fox, from the early 1930s through the 1940s.

Early years
Bari was born on December 18, 1919 in Roanoke, Virginia to John Manard Fisher (December 12, 1873 - June 4, 1927), of Lynchburg, Virginia, and his wife Marjorie Babcock Halpen (November 27, 1893 - May 11, 1960) a native of Albany, New York. Her father was a successful auto sales manager who for many years worked for a Roanoke car dealership, Harper Motor. In 1925, he left his job and moved the family to his hometown, Lynchburg, where he opened a car dealership of his own. Two years later, heavily in debt and struggling to make a sizeable profit, he, while away on a business trip, took his own life by jumping out of a hotel window. After selling everything to settle debts his widow was left with little money to support herself and her two children: John, her eldest and Marjorie. To make ends meet, she arranged for her sister, Ellen, who with her husband lived in  Melrose, Ma to take in her and her children. Failing to find work in Melrose, she moved to  Boston, where she met and soon, in March 1929, married the Reverend Robert Bitzer, a Religious Science minister. 

Bari later recalled other children at school in Boston made life miserable for her brother and her, making constant fun of their obvious Southern accents. Determined to eliminate hers, she became involved with amateur theatrics and took elocution lessons. She was enthusiastic when at the age of 13 she was told her stepfather had been reassigned to Los Angeles, where he later became the head of the Institute of Religious Science.

When she was 14 and attending drama school, Bari adopted the stage name Lynn Barrie, a composite of the names of theater actress Lynn Fontanne and author J.M. Barrie. After reading a story about the Italian city of Bari, she decided to change the spelling.

Career

Bari was one of 14 young women "launched on the trail of film stardom" August 6, 1935 when they each received a six-month contract with 20th Century Fox after spending 18 months in the company's training school. The contracts included a studio option for renewal for as long as seven years.

In most of her early films, Bari had uncredited parts usually playing receptionists or chorus girls. She struggled to find starring roles in movies. Rare leading roles included China Girl (1942), Hello, Frisco, Hello (1943), and The Spiritualist (1948). In B movies, Bari was usually cast as a "man-killer", as in Orchestra Wives (1942), or a villainess, notably Shock and Nocturne (both 1946). An exception was the dramatic lead in The Bridge of San Luis Rey (1944). During World War II, according to a survey taken of GIs, Bari was the second-most popular pinup girl after the much better-known Betty Grable.

Bari's film career fizzled out in the early 1950s when she was just in her early 30s, but she continued to work at a limited pace over the next two decades, playing matronly characters rather than temptresses. She portrayed the mother of a suicidal teenager in a 1951 drama On the Loose and a number of supporting parts.

Bari's last film appearance was as the mother of rebellious teenager Patty McCormack in The Young Runaways (1968).

She quickly took up the rising medium of television during the 1950s; she starred in the live television sitcom Detective's Wife, which ran during the summer of 1950. In 1952, Bari starred in her own sitcom Boss Lady, a summer replacement for NBC's Fireside Theater. She portrayed Gwen F. Allen, the beautiful top executive of a construction firm.

In 1955, Bari appeared in the episode "The Beautiful Miss X" of Rod Cameron's City Detective. In 1960, she played female bandit Belle Starr in the debut episode "Perilous Passage" of Overland Trail.

Her final TV appearances were in episodes of The Girl From U.N.C.L.E. and The FBI.

Commenting on her "other woman" roles, Bari once said "I seem to be a woman always with a gun in her purse. I'm terrified of guns. I go from one set to the other shooting people and stealing husbands!"

In the 1960s, Bari toured in a production of Barefoot in the Park, playing the bride's mother.

Personal life
Bari was a Republican who supported Dwight Eisenhower during the 1952 presidential election.

In Foxy Lady (2010), an authorized biography by film historian Jeff Gordon written from interviews shortly before her death, Bari suggested that, despite a 35-year career with over 166 film and television roles, a more promising career was sabotaged by unresolved problems with her domineering, alcoholic mother and her three marriages.

Bari was married to agent Walter Kane, producer Sid Luft, and psychiatrist Dr. Nathan Rickles. Bari and Luft married November 28, 1943. They divorced December 26, 1950. She and Rickles wed August 30, 1955; they divorced in 1972. Bari's first child, a daughter with Luft, was born August 7, 1945 in St. John's Hospital in Santa Monica, California, but died the next day. Two years later, she had a son, John Michael Luft (b. 1948). John Michael was the subject of "a bitter custody battle" between Luft and Bari. A judge in Los Angeles ruled in Bari's favor in November 1958, ruling that the Luft household "was an improper place in which to rear the boy."

After retiring from acting in the 1970s, Bari moved to Santa Barbara, California. In her last years, she suffered increasing problems with arthritis.

Death
On November 20, 1989, Bari was found dead in her home of an apparent heart attack. She was cremated and her ashes scattered at sea.

Hollywood Walk of Fame
Bari has two stars on the Hollywood Walk of Fame, one for movies at 6116 Hollywood Boulevard, and one for television at 6323 Hollywood Boulevard.

Filmography

Meet the Baron (1933) as College Girl
Dancing Lady (1933) as Chorus Girl
I Am Suzanne (1933) as Audience Member
Search for Beauty (1934) as Beauty Contestant Entrant
Caravan (1934) as Blonde Gypsy Girl at Inn
David Harum (1934) as Young Townswoman
Coming Out Party (1934) as Party Guest
Bottoms Up (1934) as Chorine
Stand Up and Cheer! (1934) as White House Secretary / Chorine
Handy Andy (1934) as Girl at Train Station
365 Nights in Hollywood (1934) as Showgirl
Music in the Air (1934) as Dancer
Charlie Chan in Paris (1935) as Club Patron
Under Pressure (1935) as Blonde Brooklyn Girl
The Great Hotel Murder (1935) as Wilson's Receptionist
George White's 1935 Scandals (1935) as Chorine
$10 Raise (1935) as Secretary
Spring Tonic (1935) as Bridesmaid
Doubting Thomas (1935) as Aspiring Actress
The Daring Young Man (1935) as Bridesmaid
Dante's Inferno (1935) as Beach Girl
Curly Top (1935) as Amusement Park Patron
Welcome Home (1935) as Bridesmaid
Orchids to You (1935) as Southern Belle Shop Patron
Redheads on Parade (1935) as Waitress
Ladies Love Danger (1935) as Chorus Girl
The Gay Deception (1935) as Royal Banquet Extra / Dance Extra
Charlie Chan in Shanghai (1935) as Second Hotel Switchboard Operator
Way Down East (1935) as Dancing Girl at Party
Metropolitan (1935) as Chorus Girl
Music Is Magic (1935) as Theatre Cashier
Thanks a Million (1935) as Phone Operator
The Man Who Broke the Bank at Monte Carlo (1935) as Flower Girl
Show Them No Mercy! (1935) as Crowd Scene Member
Professional Soldier (1935) as Gypsy Dancer
King of Burlesque (1936) as Dancer
My Marriage (1936) as Pat
It Had to Happen (1936) as Secretary
Song and Dance Man (1936) as Showgirl
Everybody's Old Man (1936) as Secretary, Miss Burke
The Great Ziegfeld (1936) as Ziegfeld Girl
Gentle Julia (1936) as Young Lady Outside Church / Jealous Girl at Dance
Private Number (1936) as Gambler
Poor Little Rich Girl (1936) as Radio Station Receptionist
36 Hours to Kill (1936) as Traveler
Girls' Dormitory (1936) as Student
Sing, Baby, Sing (1936) as Hotel Telephone Operator
Star for a Night (1936) as Chorus Girl
Ladies in Love (1936) as Dress Shop Clerk
15 Maiden Lane (1936) as Crowd Scene Participant
Pigskin Parade (1936) as Football Game Spectator
Under Your Spell (1936) as Airplane Passenger
Crack-Up (1936) as Office Worker
Woman-Wise (1937) as Secretary
On the Avenue (1937) as Chorus Girl / Mrs. Mary Jackson
Time Out for Romance (1937) as Bridesmaid
Love Is News (1937) as 'Babe' - Switchboard Operator
Fair Warning (1937) as Candy Counter Girl
Cafe Metropole (1937) as Cafe Patron
This Is My Affair (1937) as Party Guest with Keller
Sing and Be Happy (1937) as Secretary
Wee Willie Winkie (1937) as Crowd Scene Participant
She Had to Eat (1937) as Crowd Scene Participant
Wake Up and Live (1937) as Chorus Girl
The Lady Escapes (1937) as Bridesmaid
You Can't Have Everything (1937) as Chorus Girl
Wife, Doctor and Nurse (1937) as Party Girl
Life Begins in College (1937) as Coed
Lancer Spy (1937) as Miss Fenwick
Ali Baba Goes to Town (1937) as Harem Girl
45 Fathers (1937) as Telephone Operator
Love and Hisses (1937) as Nightclub Patron
City Girl (1938) as Waitress
The Baroness and the Butler (1938) as Klari - Maid
Walking Down Broadway (1938) as Sandra De Voe
Rebecca of Sunnybrook Farm (1938) as Myrtle
Mr. Moto's Gamble (1938) as Penny Kendall
Battle of Broadway (1938) as Marjorie Clark
Josette (1938) as Mrs. Elaine Dupree
Speed to Burn (1938) as Marion Clark
Always Goodbye (1938) as Jessica Reid
I'll Give a Million (1938) as Cecelia
Meet the Girls (1938) as Terry Wilson
Sharpshooters (1938) as Dianne Woodward
Pardon Our Nerve (1939) as Terry Wilson
The Return of the Cisco Kid (1939) as Ann Carver
Chasing Danger (1939) as Renée Claire
News Is Made at Night (1939) as Maxine Thomas
Hotel for Women (1939) as Barbara Hunter
Hollywood Cavalcade (1939) as Actress in 'The Man Who Came Back'
Pack Up Your Troubles (1939) as Yvonne
Charlie Chan in City in Darkness (1939) as Marie Dubon
City of Chance (1940) as Julie Reynolds
Free, Blonde and 21 (1940) as Carol Northrup
Lillian Russell (1940) as Edna McCauley
Earthbound (1940) as Linda Reynolds
Pier 13 (1940) as Sally Kelly
Kit Carson (1940) as Dolores Murphy
Charter Pilot (1940) as Marge Duncan
Sleepers West (1941) as Kay Bentley
Blood and Sand (1941) as Encarnacion
Sun Valley Serenade (1941) as Vivian Dawn
We Go Fast (1941) as Rose Coughlin
Moon Over Her Shoulder (1941) as Susan Rossiter
The Perfect Snob (1941) as Chris Mason
The Night Before the Divorce (1942) as Lynn Nordyke
Secret Agent of Japan (1942) as Kay Murdock
The Falcon Takes Over (1942) as Ann Riordan
The Magnificent Dope (1942) as Claire Harris
Orchestra Wives (1942) as Jaynie Stevens
China Girl (1942) as Captain Fifi
Hello, Frisco, Hello ([1943) as Bernice Croft
The Bridge of San Luis Rey (1944) as Michaela Villegas
Tampico (1944) as Katherine 'Kathy' Hall
Sweet and Low-Down (1944) as Pat Stirling
Captain Eddie (1945) as Adelaide Frost Rickenbacker
Shock (1946) as Nurse Elaine Jordan
Home Sweet Homicide (1946) as Marian Carstairs
Margie (1946) as Miss Isabel Palmer
Nocturne (1946) as Frances Ransom
Man From Texas (1948) as Zee Simms - alias Zee Heath
The Amazing Mr. X (1948) as Christine Faber
The Kid from Cleveland (1949) as Katherine Jackson
I'd Climb the Highest Mountain (1951) as Mrs. Billywith
On the Loose (1951) as Alice Bradley
Sunny Side of the Street (1951) as Mary
I Dream of Jeanie (1952) as Mrs. McDowell
Has Anybody Seen My Gal? (1952) as Harriet Blaisdell
Francis Joins the WACS (1954) as Maj. Louise Simpson
Abbott and Costello Meet the Keystone Kops (1955) as Leota Van Cleef
The Women of Pitcairn Island (1956) as Maimiti
Damn Citizen (1958) as Pat Noble
Elfego Baca: Six Gun Law (1962) as Mrs. Simmons
Trauma (1962) as Helen Garrison
The Young Runaways (1968) as Mrs. Donford

Television
Science Fiction Theater (1955) one episode as Verda Wingate
Ben Casey (1961) one episode as Ethel Dixon
Death Valley Days (1964) one episode as Belle Wilgus
Perry Mason (1964 and 1965) one episode as Sylvia Cord; another episode as Ruth Duncan
The Girl From U.N.C.L.E. (1967) one episode as Miss Twickum
’’Ripcord (1963) one episode as Meg Collins

Radio appearances

References

Further reading
 
Foxy Lady: The Authorized Biography of Lynn Bari by Jeff Gordon (BearManor Media, 2010, 500 pp. )

External links

Authorized Biography 

Lynn Bari photos
Glamour Girls of the Silver Screen

American film actresses
People from Roanoke, Virginia
Actresses from Virginia
1919 births
1989 deaths
20th-century American actresses
20th Century Studios contract players
Religious Science
California Republicans
Virginia Republicans